This is the list of The Late Show with Stephen Colbert episodes that aired in 2020. Beginning on March 30, Colbert, as with other late night show hosts, took to filming at home due to the COVID-19 pandemic in the United States under the banner of A Late Show with Stephen Colbert. House band Stay Human did not perform, other than bandleader Jon Batiste playing piano from his residence. Beginning on August 10, Colbert resumed filming in the building that houses the Ed Sullivan Theater, from a "converted storage room eight floors" above the regular set in the Ed Sullivan Theater, without a live audience.

2020

January

February

March

April

May

June

July

August

September

October

November

December

References

External links
Official website

 Lineups at Interbridge 

Episodes 2020
Lists of American non-fiction television series episodes
Lists of variety television series episodes
2020 American television seasons
Late Show with Stephen Colbert